Matthias Farley (born July 15, 1992) is an American football free safety for the Las Vegas Raiders of the National Football League (NFL). He played college football at Notre Dame. Farley was signed by the Arizona Cardinals as an undrafted free agent in 2016. He has also played for the Indianapolis Colts, the New York Jets and the Tennessee Titans.

College career
Farley played in 52 games (26 starts) in four seasons at Notre Dame and recorded 192 tackles, 9.5 tackles for loss, 3.5 sacks, eight interceptions, 13 passes defensed and one forced fumble. He began his collegiate career as a wide receiver and redshirted in 2011. He moved to safety in 2012.

Professional career

Arizona Cardinals
On April 30, 2016, the Arizona Cardinals signed Farley to a three-year, $1.62 million contract after he went undrafted in the 2016 NFL Draft.

Throughout training camp, Farley competed for a roster spot as a backup safety and special teams contributor against Chris Clemons, Marqui Christian, Durell Eskridge, and Tyrequek Zimmerman. On September 3, 2016, the Cardinals waived Farley as part of final roster cuts.

Indianapolis Colts

On September 4, 2016, the Indianapolis Colts claimed Farley off of waivers. Upon joining the team, head coach Chuck Pagano named him the third free safety on the Colts' depth chart, behind Clayton Geathers and T. J. Green.

He made his professional regular season debut in the Indianapolis Colts' season-opening 39–35 loss to the Detroit Lions. The following week, Farley recorded two solo tackles during a 34–20 loss at the Denver Broncos in Week 2. He made his first career tackle on running back C. J. Anderson in the fourth quarter after Anderson caught a six-yard pass. On January 1, 2017, Farley tied his season-high of two solo tackles in the Colts' 24–20 victory against the Jacksonville Jaguars.

2017
During organized team activities and training camp, he competed for a job as a backup safety against T. J. Green, Andrew Williamson, Tyvis Powell, Lee Hightower, and Tyson Graham. He became the frontrunner for the role of starting strong safety after rookie first round pick Malik Hooker sustained numerous injuries throughout OTA's and training camp. Defensive coordinator Ted Monachino named Farley the starting strong safety to begin the regular season, along with free safety Darius Butler.

He made his first career start in the Indianapolis Colts' season-opener against the Los Angeles Rams and recorded ten combined tackles (eight solo) in their 46–9 loss. On October 1, 2017, Farley made ten combined tackles (four solo), a pass deflection, and made his first career interception off a pass by quarterback Russell Wilson in the Colts' 46–18 loss at the Seattle Seahawks in Week 4. In Week 14, Farley recorded nine combined tackles, broke up a pass, and intercepted a pass by quarterback Joe Webb during a 13–7 loss at the Buffalo Bills. The following week, he collected a career-high 11 combined tackles (three solo) in the Colts' 25–13 loss to the Denver Broncos. Farley finished the  season with 98 combined tackles (60 solo), seven pass deflections, and two interceptions in 16 games and 15 starts. Pro Football Focus gave Farley an overall grade of 82.2, ranking 24th among all qualified safeties in 2017.

In 2018, Farley was named the backup strong safety behind Clayton Geathers. He played in five games with one start before being placed on injured reserve on October 12, 2018 with shoulder, groin, and wrist injuries.

On August 26, 2019, Farley was released by the Colts.

New York Jets

On August 30, 2019, Farley signed with the New York Jets. Farley was released during final roster cuts on September 5, 2020, but was re-signed two days later.

Tennessee Titans
On March 30, 2021, Farley was signed by the Tennessee Titans to a one-year deal.

Las Vegas Raiders
On July 21, 2022, Farley was signed by the Las Vegas Raiders. He was waived on August 30, 2022 and signed to the practice squad the next day. 

Farley was elevated to the active roster in the first three game of the regular season, against Los Angeles Chargers, Arizona Cardinals and Tennessee Titans, and reverted the next day to the practice squad.

On September 29, 2022, the Raiders signed Farley to the active roster from the practice squad.

NFL career statistics

Regular season

Personal life
Farley was raised by his parents, Mark and Falinda Farley, and has four brothers and two sisters named Timon, Nathan, Charis, Kenan, Joy and Silas. He does charity work, kayaks, and plays the ukulele and kazoo. He also has a German shorthaired pointer named Harper.

References

External links
 Tennessee Titans bio
 Notre Dame Fighting Irish bio

1992 births
Living people
Players of American football from Charlotte, North Carolina
American football safeties
Notre Dame Fighting Irish football players
Arizona Cardinals players
Indianapolis Colts players
New York Jets players
Tennessee Titans players